Gander—Grand Falls was a federal electoral district in Newfoundland and Labrador, Canada, that was represented in the House of Commons of Canada from 1988 to 2004.

This riding was created in 1987 from parts of Gander—Twillingate and Grand Falls—White Bay—Labrador  ridings. It was abolished in 2003 when it was redistributed into Bonavista—Exploits, Humber—St. Barbe—Baie Verte and Random—Burin—St. George's ridings.

Members of Parliament

This riding elected the following Members of Parliament:

George Baker, a Liberal, represented the riding from the 1997 general election until he was appointed to the Senate of Canada in 2002. Rex Barnes, a Progressive Conservative, won the 2002 by-election held to replace Baker, and represented the riding for the remainder of that Parliament.

Election results

See also 

 List of Canadian federal electoral districts
 Past Canadian electoral districts

External links 
 Riding history for Gander—Grand Falls (1987–2003) from the Library of Parliament

Former federal electoral districts of Newfoundland and Labrador